Raymond Chikapa Enock Phiri (23 March 1947 – 12 July 2017) was a South African jazz, fusion and mbaqanga musician born in Mpumalanga to Thabethe Phiri, a Malawian immigrant worker, and South African guitarist nicknamed "Just Now" Phiri. He was a founding member of the Cannibals in the 1970s. He collaborated with Paul Simon and Ladysmith Black Mambazo on Simon's Graceland (1986) album.

Career
Ray Phiri was born near Nelspruit in the then Eastern Transvaal, now Mpumalanga Province, in South Africa. In 1985, Paul Simon asked Ray along with Ladysmith Black Mambazo and other South African musicians to join his Graceland (1986) project, which was successful and also helped the South African musicians to make names for themselves abroad.

Phiri was to collaborate with Simon again on Simon's Rhythm of the Saints (1990), which saw him perform in over 30 nations during 1990 and 1991, including in Paul Simon's Concert in the Park (1991) and at New York's Madison Square Garden, as well as appearing on Saturday Night Live and other top television shows in the United States. The tour concluded in early 1992 with concerts staged in South Africa at venues in Johannesburg, Cape Town, Port Elizabeth and Durban. In 2012, Simon organised a European Graceland 25th Anniversary Tour in which Phiri also contributed his voice, guitar and leadership.

In a 2011 interview with The Sunday Times Phiri said that there was "bad blood" between him and Simon. Phiri maintained that Simon never gave him credit for the songs he had written for Graceland, and that Ladysmith Black Mambazo "hardly got any royalties". But he added: "maybe I wouldn't have been able to handle all that wealth. I sleep at night, I have my sanity and I enjoy living. The big rock 'n' roll machine did not munch me."

Personal life and death
Phiri was involved in a series of car accidents which affected his personal life and musical career. Phiri was badly injured in 1987 in a crash that claimed the lives of his band manager and six others. In 2003, his wife was killed in a car accident, but Ray escaped serious injury. Phiri was diagnosed with lung cancer and died at the age of 70 on 12 July 2017 at a Nelspruit hospital. A memorial service for Phiri was held at the Mbombela Stadium in Nelspruit on 20 July, and the funeral service took place at the same venue on 22 July.

Achievements
Phiri has received many awards in recognition for his contribution in the music industry, one of these is the Order of Ikhamanga in Silver awarded to him by the South African president. This was to honor his sterling contribution to the South African music industry and the successful use of arts as an instrument of social transformation.

Discography

With the Cannibals
 1982: Mama Wami 
 1982: Stimela
 1984: Fire, Passion and Ecstasy
 1985: Shadows, Fear and Pain
 1986: Look, Listen and Decide
 1986: Rewind (released due to popular demand after Look, Listen and Decide)
 1987: Unfinished Story
 1988: Live!
 1989: Trouble in the Land of Plenty
 1990: The Second Half (Live)
 1991: Siyaya 
 1994: Don't Ask Why
 2003: Steam Tracks ("Best of" compilation) 
 2010: A Lifetime...
 2010: Live in Concert 25 Years

Solo
 1992: People Don't Talk, So Let's Talk
 1999: How 
 2000: Chikapa's 11 Years

References

External links 
Profile on music.org.za
Profile on allmusic.com

1947 births
2017 deaths
People from Mbombela
South African jazz guitarists
Recipients of the Order of Ikhamanga
Lead guitarists
South African people of Malawian descent
Deaths from lung cancer
Deaths from cancer in South Africa
20th-century South African male singers
South African jazz singers
Male jazz musicians
21st-century South African male singers